Amara Asavananda (born May 6, 1937) is a Thai actress and the second runner-up of Miss Thailand 1953. She is the first daughter of Luang Prachoet-aksoralak (Sombhoj Asavananda) and Madam Georgette Asavananda. Her father was Thai and her mother was French. She was the 2nd Runner-up Miss Thailand 1953 and she competed in Miss Universe 1954 pageant competition held in United States.

She is an actress in Thai film and television drama as Prisana (1955), Leb-krut (1957), Rak Rissaya (1958), In-sree Dang (1958), Hao Dong (1958), Toong Ruang Rong (1959), See Kings (1959), Chaleoy Suk (1959,) Sud Pradthana (1961) etc.

In 1966, she married police lieutenant general Ankoon Purananda, and they have two daughters, Apichaya and Anoma.

References 

1937 births
Living people
Amara Asavananda
Amara Asavananda
Miss Universe 1954 contestants
Amara Asavananda
Amara Asavananda
Amara Asavananda
Amara Asavananda
Amara Asavananda